The 1960 Australian Grand Prix was a motor race held at Lowood in Queensland, Australia on 12 June 1960.  The race, which was run to Formula Libre, had 16 starters.

It was the twenty fifth Australian Grand Prix. Alec Mildren won his only AGP, which was also the second AGP victory for a rear-engined racing car. Mildren eschewed the more usual Coventry Climax FPF engine in favour of a Maserati sports car unit to power his Cooper T51, one of many competitors at the time who tried sports car engines in racing car chassis. Davison's Aston Martin DBR4 too had a sports car engine replacing the 2.5-litre powerplant, this being 3.0 litre unit from a 
DBR1.

Classification 
Results as follows.

Notes 
 Attendance: 25,000
Pole position: Alec Mildren - 1'45.9
Fastest lap: Lex Davison - 1'44.0, 97.7 mph, new lap record

References

External links
 Open Wheelers 1960, autopics.com.au
 Grand Prix of Australia, www.silhouet.com
 1960 Gold Star results, members.optusnet.com.au/dandsshaw via web.archive.org

Grand Prix
Australian Grand Prix
Sports competitions in Queensland
Australian Grand Prix